Grzegorz Polakow (born 10 March 1935) is a Polish retired football manager who spent the majority of his career managing teams in the Pomeranian area.

Career
Born in Vilnius, which was then part of Poland, Polakow's family will have moved to Gdańsk during the Polish population transfers. He played in the Lechia youth teams but never progressed to the first team. After failing to become a footballer Polakow became a football manager at the age of 24, starting with small village and town teams of Jedność Gościcino in Gościcino and Grom Wejherowo in Wejherowo. Polakow's first big move in management was with Zawisza Bydgoszcz who he joined in 1960. He helped Zawisza get promoted to the I liga for the first time in their history, but wasn't in place for their first season of top flight football. Polakow managed Meduza Gdańsk for four seasons from 1962 to 1965. In 1965 Polakow moved to manage Arka Gdynia, spending six seasons at the club, which would be his longest spell at one club. During his time at Arka he experienced a relegation, before being promoted straight away the season after. He moved to Stoczniowiec Gdańsk in 1971, once again winning promotion with a team securing promotion to the II liga winning the league in the 1972–73 season. In 1974 he managed Bałtyk Gdynia, ŁKS Łódź in 1975, and Lechia Gdańsk in 1976, with whom he helped to finish runners-up with in the II liga. After four years out of management, Polakow returned to management with Cracovia in 1980. He had two more short spells with Odra Opole and again with Arka Gdynia, both spells were in 1981, before taking another break from management until 1988 when he joined Stal Stalowa Wola, and then with Bałtyk Gdynia from 1988 to 1989. After another break, Polakow returned to management for the final time with Bałtyk Gdynia in 1994, and finally once more with Arka Gdynia, being part of the 1994–95 season when Arka was in turmoil, having five different managers over the course of the season. After this spell with Arka, Polakow retired from management in 1995.

Honours
Zawisza Bydgoszcz
 II liga runners-up: 1960

Arka Gdynia
 III liga: 1968–69

Stoczniowiec Gdańsk
 III liga: 1972–73

Lechia Gdańsk
 II liga runners-up: 1975–76

References

Living people
1935 births
People from Wilno Voivodeship (1926–1939)
Sportspeople from Vilnius
Polish footballers
Lechia Gdańsk players
Polish football managers
Lechia Gdańsk managers
Arka Gdynia managers
ŁKS Łódź managers
Zawisza Bydgoszcz managers
MKS Cracovia managers
Odra Opole managers
Widzew Łódź managers
Association footballers not categorized by position